The Weekend is an American comedy film written and directed by Stella Meghie. It stars Sasheer Zamata, Tone Bell, DeWanda Wise, Y'lan Noel, and Kym Whitley. It had its world premiere at the Toronto International Film Festival on September 11, 2018. Lionsgate released the film in theaters on September 13, 2019.

Synopsis

The Toronto International Film Festival described the film, "An acerbic comedian (Sasheer Zamata) becomes romantically entangled with her ex (Tone Bell), his new girlfriend (DeWanda Wise), and another guest (Y’Lan Noel) during a weekend getaway."

Cast
Sasheer Zamata as Zadie Barber, Bradford’s ex and Karen’s daughter
Tone Bell as Bradford Collins, Zadie’s ex and Margo’s boyfriend
DeWanda Wise as Margo Johnson, Bradford’s new girlfriend
Y'lan Noel as Aubrey, guest of Inn 
Kym Whitley as Karen Barber, Zadie’s mother

Production
In March 2018, Sasheer Zamata, Tone Bell, DeWanda Wise, Y'lan Noel and Kym Whitley had joined the cast of the film, with Stella Meghie directing from a screenplay she wrote. Meghie, Sarah Lazow, James Gibb, Stephanie Allain and Mel Jones produced the film under their Marada Pictures and Homegrown Pictures banners, respectively.

Release
It was released on September 13, 2019.

Critical reception
The site's critical consensus reads, "Led by a potentially star-making performance from Sasheer Zamata, The Weekend takes a well-acted, smartly written approach to familiar character dynamics."

See also
List of black films of the 2010s

References

External links
 

2018 films
American comedy films
Films directed by Stella Meghie
Lionsgate films
2010s English-language films
2010s American films
African-American films